Harrington House may refer to:

in the United Kingdom
 13 Kensington Palace Gardens, known as Harrington House. Former townhouse of the Earl of Harrington and currently the residence of the Russian ambassador in London
 Harrington House, Craig's Court, Whitehall, central London: built in 1702 for William Stanhope, 1st Earl of Harrington, now a Government building
Harrington House, Bourton-on-the-Water, Gloucestershire

in the United States (by state then city)
Harrington-Birchett House, Tempe, Arizona, listed on the National Register of Historic Places in Maricopa County, Arizona
Connelly-Harrington House, Siloam Springs, Arkansas, listed on the NRHP in Benton County, Arkansas
Holladay-Harrington House, Greenville, Delaware, listed on the NRHP in New Castle County, Delaware 
Harrington Meetinghouse, Pemaquid, Maine, NRHP-listed
Harrington (Princess Anne, Maryland), NRHP-listed
Theodore Harrington House, Southbridge, Massachusetts, NRHP-listed
Harrington Block, Waltham, Massachusetts, NRHP-listed
Samuel Harrington House, Waltham, Massachusetts, NRHP-listed
Harrington House (Weston, Massachusetts), NRHP-listed
Rose Harrington House, Stevensville, Montana, listed on the NRHP in Ravalli County, Montana 
Harrington-Smith Block, Manchester, New Hampshire, listed on the NRHP in Hillsborough County, New Hampshire 
Harrington Cobblestone Farmhouse and Barn Complex, Hartland, New York, NRHP-listed
Harrington-Dewar House, Holly Springs, North Carolina, listed on the NRHP in Harnett County, North Carolina 
Harrington House (Dayton, Oregon), listed on the NRHP in Yamhill County, Oregon
Landergin-Harrington House, Amarillo, Texas, listed on the NRHP in Potter County, Texas
Harrington House (Bethel, Vermont), listed on the NRHP in Windsor County, Vermont
Harrington Bank Block and Opera House, Harrington, Washington, listed on the NRHP in Lincoln County, Washington